The 1998 Townsville and Thuringowa city floods
 began on 10 January 1998, the cities of Townsville and Thuringowa were hit by one of the worst floods in the cities' history.

Floods
What was a remnant of Ex-Cyclone Sid in the Coral Sea near Cardwell had produced a band of strong gales that slowly moved south between Cardwell and Bowen with wind gusts of up to 90 km/h, as it moved south into the Ingham area, Ingham had received around 295mm between 9pm and 9am the morning of 9 January. During the day, the heaviest band of rain kept moving south to be on top of the Townsville area, although Townsville had only relatively light rain during the day, (apx 43mm between 9am and 6pm), it was overnight that the intense rainfall caused severe flash flooding and high flood levels in the streams and rivers in the area. Around 335mm of rain had fallen on the 10th between 6pm and midnight and a further 236mm fell in the next 3 hours.

Late into the evening, the heaviest of the rain was now falling and gale-force winds were continuing (at its heaviest, the rain was falling at 100mm per hour) as most streets in the city are flat, the city streets were underwater and blocked by fallen trees and power lines. Water was up to 3 meters deep through parts of the CBD and hundreds of businesses and homes were inundated in both Townsville and Thuringowa, plus around 200 people had to be evacuated.
 
Black River was badly hit with 48 homes being uninhabitable, 14 homes destroyed and 8 being washed out to sea when the river broke its banks and at Bluewater 40 homes were badly damaged, while 5 other homes in the city had been destroyed plus 100's flooded, phones were out in most parts the city and fallen power lines and flooded substations cut power to around 50% of homes. A landslide, estimated to be 20,000 cubic meters destroyed 12 and damaged 6 units on a Magnetic Island resort and another landslide destroyed a million dollar home on Stanton Terrace and boulders were also loosened on Castle Hill and rolled down into Stuart Street in the CBD. Townsville was declared a state of emergency that night. 
Rain had eased a little by the 11th but still had some heavy rain pass through, Ex-Cyclone Sid, a weak surface low was still just to the north of Townsville during Monday 12 January and by midday the trough had redeveloped again and heavy rain moved into the city for the rest of the day.
With many businesses closed due to the weekend damage, the new lot of rain caused a complete shutdown of the city and many workers battled renewed floodwaters trying to get home, even emergency workers had to abandon cleanup work for the rest of the day. On the 10 and 11 January, Townsville airport recorded 549mm in 24 hours and from the 11th and 12th through to the 9am the 13th 245mm fell, giving a 3-day record of 794mm. The period of the 10th to the 11th has since been dubbed the 'Night of Noah' by Townsville residents.  Other areas around the city had readings of 895mm up to 1300mm.

Aftermath
The morning of the 11th has been described as the worst devastation in the city since Cyclone Althea in 1971. Most roads in the city were impassable; the Bruce Highway was closed to the north and south of the city as were all rail links as at the time they were still under water; the airport was closed to all commercial traffic as the runway was under water, and the navigation aids still out of order, electricity was off in most of the city and water was also off in the northern suburbs of Thuringowa, all sewage pumping stations were inoperable (one was underwater), Queensland Nickel's tailings dam at the Yabulu nickel refinery had overflowed spilling the pollutants into the nearby flooded river and out to the sea, one resident found two cars and a yacht in his yard, and sadly one person was confirmed dead, after being washed off a flooded road in his car.

The total damage bill was in excess of $100million.

References 

Townsville
Floods in Queensland
Townsville floods
Townsville floods
Townsville floods
Townsville floods